There are several lists of individual animals on Wikipedia. These are lists of notable, non-fictional, specific animals (as opposed to groups of categories of animals).

 List of individual apes
 Oldest hominoids
 List of individual bears
List of giant pandas
 List of individual birds
 List of individual cats
 List of oldest cats
 List of individual dogs
 List of oldest dogs
 List of individual elephants
 List of animals in film and television
 List of animals awarded human credentials
 List of leading Thoroughbred racehorses
 List of historical horses
 List of individual bovines
 List of individual cetaceans
List of captive orca
 List of individual monkeys
 List of wealthiest animals
 List of wolves
 List of individual pigs